Electoral reform in Puerto Rico refers to the efforts to reform the process and regulation of voting, as well as the electoral and governmental relations with the United States in the unincorporated territory of the Commonwealth of Puerto Rico.

Since 1917, people born in Puerto Rico are U.S. citizens. As such, they are entitled to vote at the federal level, but not from the island, as the territory is not incorporated. The legal restriction to vote at the federal level extends only to the territory, not to its citizens. This means that all U.S. citizens can vote at the federal level from any part of the world or incorporated territories of the U.S. and that no U.S. citizen may vote at the federal level if they are in Puerto Rico, although they can vote at the local level.

See also

Voting rights in Puerto Rico
Political status of Puerto Rico
Politics of Puerto Rico

 
Massachusetts